Gregory Marcellus Schiemer (born 16 January 1949) is an Australian electronic music composer, instrument builder, and teacher. His artistic preoccupations include creative engagement with new technology, music created for non-expert performance and intercultural-interfaith dialogue.

Background and training 
Born in Dunedoo, in Central Western New South Wales, Greg Schiemer attended Holy Cross College, Ryde, and finished high school in the Passionist minor seminary at St Ives and at the Sydney Technical College, Ultimo. He completed a B.Mus at Sydney University where he studied composition with Peter Sculthorpe to whom he owes an enduring interest in music from Asia and the world of Harry Partch. Through David Ahern, he discovered experimental music and in particular, the work of Cornelius Cardew and John Cage.

The foundations of his work as composer and instrument-builder were laid while he was a musical collaborator of Philippa Cullen. Working with her electronic dance ensemble, he learned the craft of electronics under the tutelage of electronic engineer Phil Connor and organ builder Arthur Spring and between 1972 and 1975 together they built some of the earliest electronic music systems that react to dance movement.

Between 1976 and 1981 he worked for Digital Equipment Australia, a division of Digital Equipment Corporation, initially in computer field service and later as senior design technician and in 1999 he was awarded a PhD in electronics from Macquarie University.

Teaching and research 
He first taught electronic music composition at the Canberra School of Music from 1983, before moving in 1986 to the Sydney Conservatorium. There he mentored musicians working with new technology and participated in the activities of watt, the electro-acoustic group co-founded by composers Martin Wesley-Smith and Ian Fredericks. In 2003 he moved to the University of Wollongong where he supervised postgraduate composers and coordinated interdisciplinary research involving sound across a variety of disciplines within creative arts and informatics. He was also the lead chief investigator for Australian Research Council projects focused on mobile technology, haptic instruments and microtonal performance.

Instruments 
His electronic instruments include:

 Tupperware Gamelan (1977–1983) – a collection of instruments designed to be played by an ensemble of non-expert players. The instruments were so-named because electronics were mounted in plastic kitchenware while gamelan was a metaphor for collaborative musical engagement. They were easy to play and quick to learn and were used principally to accompany dance. They included battery-powered sound sources called UFOs that produce the Doppler effect as a sound source moves. These first appeared in a choreographic project by Yen Lu Wong entitled Between Silence and Light which culminated in a dance performance on the northern boardwalk of the Sydney Opera House accompanied by 4 UFOs, 4 handbells and 12 bamboo poles. The UFOs were precursors of more generic flying instruments, the Pocket Gamelan.
 MIDI Tool Box (1984–1996) – a microcontroller system for interactive composition. It grew from live algorithmic compositions Monophonic Variations and Polyphonic Variations which he created as firmware written for the Datum microcomputer and realised in collaboration with electro-percussionist Graeme Leak. The MIDI Tool Box system was used in an interactive broadcast event and in concert performances with remnants of the Tupperware Gamelan as well as performance and installation work created by other composers. The hardware eventually incorporated the A4 audio signal processor developed at the CSIRO Division of Radiophysics and this was used in live concerts in 1995 with Carnatic violinist Krishna Kumar, and in 1996 with veena player Narayan Mani and Bharatnatyam-Kuchupudi choreographer Siri Rama.
 Pocket Gamelan (2003–) – a set of microtonal instruments realised as software developed for mobile phones. Inspired by the legacy of Partch, represented in the work of contemporary tuning theorist and microtonal instrument builder Erv Wilson, the Pocket Gamelan was initially developed in the java language and recently migrated to iPhone. It has been used in live performances at international venues for computer music and microtonal music and in collaborations with musicians in Singapore at ISEA2008 and in Indonesia at GAUNG, a cultural workshop convened by the Sacred Bridge Foundation. Leading researchers have acknowledged the role the Pocket Gamelan has played in the development of performance with mobile devices.

Compositions 
 Polyphonic Variations (1988)
 Vedic Mass (1997)
 Tempered Dekanies (2001)
 Mandala 10 (2011)

Awards 
 Australia Council Composers Fellowship 1994

References

Further reading 
 Burt, Warren. "Experimental Music from Australia Using Live Electronics", Contemporary Music Review, vol 6, no. 1, London, 1991, pp. 159–172.
 Jenkins, John. 22 Contemporary Australian Composers. Melbourne: NMA Publications, 1988.
 Schiemer, Greg. MIDI Tool Box: An interactive system for music composition. PhD thesis, Macquarie University. 1999.
 Schiemer, Greg. "Interactive Radio", Leonardo Music Journal, vol 17, no. 4, MIT Press 1994.

External links 
 ABC Radio National Podcast: Stephen Adams interviews Greg Schiemer on the Pocket Gamelan
 Greg Schiemer, Australian Music Centre
 Mandala 5 (a 48 second extract)
 

1949 births
Living people
Australian electronic musicians